Clarence Ross Turner III (born May 15, 1964) is an American politician. He is a member of the South Carolina Senate from the 8th District, serving since 2012. Turner is a member of the Republican party.

Early life
Turner is the son of Clarence Ross Jr. (1931–2013) and Anne Summers Turner, and was born in Greenville, South Carolina. After earning a B.S. degree in Financial Management from Clemson University in 1986, he married wife Julie on January 20, 1990, and has three children. Turner became a Certified Insurance Counselor in 1994 and heads his family's insurance business.

Political career
Turner ran against incumbent representative David L. Thomas and three others in the 2012 Republican primary election, and beat Joe Swann narrowly in a runoff election. He ran unopposed in the 2012 and 2016 general elections. Turner was challenged unsuccessfully by Janice Curtis in the 2020 primary election, winning with about 68 percent of the vote.

Turner is a member of the following state senate committees in the 2021–2022 legislative session:

As of May 2020, Turner was part of a new Reopen South Carolina select committee, which worked on policy for the post-COVID reopening of the state's economy.

References

Living people
1964 births
21st-century American politicians
Clemson University alumni
People from Greenville, South Carolina
Republican Party South Carolina state senators